The I-80 Rape Series is a series of rapes that was committed by a serial rapist in Sacramento, California.

Crimes 
While many have been convinced that other assaults took place by the same man, only three have been successfully linked by DNA:
 September 9, 2013 at 4:20am
 December 10, 2013 at 9:15pm
 January 8, 2014 at 4:30am

Suspects eliminated 
 Robert Hill - Despite Hill being a convicted serial rapist, detectives from the Sacramento Sheriff's Department ruled him out and announced that he was not connected to the series of rapes.
 Kenneth Anderson - Victims of the I-80 Rapist were convinced, when shown Anderson, that he strongly resembled their attacker. However, Anderson gave DNA and he was cleared as a suspect in the rapes.

References 

History of Sacramento, California
Rapes in the United States
Crimes in California
Interstate 80
Unidentified American rapists
September 2013 crimes in the United States
December 2013 crimes in the United States
January 2014 crimes in the United States